Norman Spencer Binsted (October 2, 1890 – February 20, 1961) was a missionary bishop of the Episcopal Church in the United States of America, serving first in the Nippon Sei Ko Kai and in the Philippines.

He was Bishop of Tohoku from 1928 until 1940, and was Bishop of the Philippines until his retirement in 1957.

References 

New York Times obituary

External links 

1890 births
1961 deaths
Bishops of the Episcopal Church (United States)
20th-century American Episcopalians
Anglican bishops of Tohoku
20th-century American clergy